The 1949 season was the 19th completed season of Finnish Football League Championship, known as the Mestaruussarja.

Overview
The Mestaruussarja was administered by the Finnish Football Association and the competition's 1949 season was contested by 12 teams. TPS Turku won the championship and the four lowest placed teams of the competition, HIFK Helsinki, HJK Helsinki, HPS Helsinki and TuTo Turku, were relegated to the Suomensarja.

League standings

Results

Footnotes

References
Finland - List of final tables (RSSSF)

Mestaruussarja seasons
Fin
Fin
1